The Nigerian foreign ministry is a statutory body created to re-inforce foreign decision making and implementation processes in Nigeria and handle the external promotion of Nigeria's domestic vision and ideals; it is headed by a federal executive cabinet minister. As of late its mission has geared towards increasing awareness about Nigeria's economic potential. It is part of the government's executive branch.

The ministry was created in 1961, with Prime Minister Tafawa Balewa appointing Jaja Wachuku the inaugural Minister of Foreign Affairs and Commonwealth Relations. Before Wachuku's tenure, Balewa had doubled as Foreign Affairs advocate of Nigeria, from 1960 to 1961.

List of Ministers
 Jaja Wachuku (1961–1965)
 Nuhu Bamalli (1965–1966)
 Yakubu Gowon (1966–1967)
 Arikpo Okoi (1967–1975)
 Joseph Nanven Garba (1975–1978)
 Henry Adefope (1978–1979)
 Ishaya Audu (1979–1983)
 Emeka Anyaoku (1983)
 Ibrahim Gambari (1984–1985)
 Bolaji Akinyemi (1985–1987)
 Ike Nwachukwu (1987–1989)
 Rilwan Lukman (1989–1990)
 Ike Nwachukwu (1990–1993)
 Matthew Mbu (1993)
 Babagana Kingibe (1993–1995)
 Tom Ikimi (1995–1998)
 Ignatius Olisemeka (1998–1999)
 Sule Lamido (1999–2003)
 Oluyemi Adeniji (2003–2006)
 Ngozi Okonjo-Iweala (2006) 
 Joy Ogwu (2006–2007)
 Ojo Maduekwe (2007–2010)
 Martin Ihoeghian Uhomoibhi (Supervising) (2010)
 Henry Odein Ajumogobia (2010–2011)
 Olugbenga Ashiru (2011–2013)
 Viola Onwuliri (Supervising) (2013–2014)
 Aminu Bashir Wali (2014–2015)
 Geoffrey Onyeama (2015–present)

References

External links
 Official portal

Main
Foreign
Nigeria diplomacy-related lists